Grafenauer is a Slovenian surname related to the German toponym Grafenau.

Notable people with this surname include:

 Bogo Grafenauer (1916–1995), Slovenian historian
 Irena Grafenauer (born 1957), Slovenian flute player
 Ivan Grafenauer (1880–1964), Slovenian literature historian
 Niko Grafenauer (born 1940), Slovenian author